Severo-Kurilsky District is an administrative district (raion) of Sakhalin Oblast, Russia; one of the seventeen in the oblast. Municipally, it is incorporated as Severo-Kurilsky Urban Okrug. It is located on the northern Kuril Islands to the east of the Island of Sakhalin and immediately southwest of the Kamchatka Peninsula. Its administrative center is the town of Severo-Kurilsk on Paramushir island. Population:  The population of Severo-Kurilsk accounts for almost 100% of the district's total population, though there is often a seasonal population on the island of Shumshu.

Islands

The district includes the following islands from north to south:

References

Notes

Sources

Districts of Sakhalin Oblast